GEDI Gruppo Editoriale S.p.A., formerly known as Gruppo Editoriale L'Espresso S.p.A. is an Italian media conglomerate. Founded in 1955, it is based in Turin, Italy.

History
In 2009, the group L'Espresso created an online advertising consortium with RCS MediaGroup.

In March 2016, the Italiana Editrice (ITEDI, group La Stampa) merged with L'Espresso group to create the leading Italian group in print and online information.

In May 2017, the group changed its names from Gruppo Editoriale L'Espresso to GEDI Gruppo Editoriale. In 2020 EXOR, the company of the Agnelli-family took over GEDI Gruppo Editoriale and became the controlling owner.

Description
Newspapers:
150,000 to 200,000 copies: la Repubblica
100,000 to 150,000 copies: La Stampa
25,000 to 50,000 copies: Messaggero Veneto, Il Secolo XIX
10,000 to 25,000 copies: Il Piccolo, Gazzetta di Mantova, Il Mattino di Padova 
5,000 to 10,000 copies: La Provincia Pavese, La Tribuna di Treviso, La Nuova Venezia, Corriere delle Alpi, La Sentinella del Canavese
Online newspapers: Huffington Post (Italian edition), Alfemminile, Mashable (Italian edition)
Magazines: Limes, National Geographic Italia (Italian edition of National Geographic Magazine), Le Scienze (Italian edition of Scientific American), Mente & Cervello,  Le Guide dell'Espresso
Radio stations: Radio DeeJay, Radio Capital, m2o
Television channels: Repubblica Radio TV, Deejay TV, myDeejay, Onda Latina
Web portals: Kataweb
Advertising: A. Manzoni & C.
Education: Somedia

Formerly owned 

 Il Tirreno, Gazzetta di Reggio, Gazzetta di Modena, La Nuova Ferrara and La Nuova Sardegna, ceded to the SAE Group in 2020 and 2021;
 Il Centro and La Città, ceded to local businessmen in 2017;
 Alto Adige and Trentino, ceded to Athesia Group in 2017;
 L'Espresso, ceded to BFC Group in 2022;
 MicroMega, closed in 2020 (later re-opened with a new ownership);

Shareholding
In December 2019, the board of GEDI accepted Exor's offer to buy 43,78% of its stocks.

As of 2019 the main shareholders were:
 CIR Group - 43%
 Giovanni Agnelli BV (including Exor)  - 6,9 %
 Carlo Perrone - 5%
 Sia Blu (Giacaranda Caracciolo Falck) - 5%

References

External links
  

Italian companies established in 1955
Publishing companies established in 1955
 
Publishing companies of Italy
Italian-language television networks
Newspaper companies of Italy